The Buffalo Sabres Alumni Hockey Team is an independent barnstorming hockey (and occasionally basketball) team located in Buffalo, New York. Its roster consists entirely of retired National Hockey League players, mostly former members of the Buffalo Sabres. The team is operated by the Buffalo Sabres Alumni Association.

The team plays teams assembled by various local organizations around Western New York primarily as charity fundraisers. Its uniform is identical to the classic "blue and gold" Sabres home (white) uniform from 1970 to 1996.

The team considers KeyBank Center to be its home arena but rarely plays there.

One of its more recent and most notable games took place on March 29, 2007, when the team played a home game against the Buffalo Police Department as a fundraiser for police officer Patty Parete, who suffered spinal injury from a gunshot wound. The game drew over 7,000 fans as the Sabres Alumni won.

The Alumni Team played at HSBC Arena as part of the pre-game events for the 2008 NHL Winter Classic held at Ralph Wilson Stadium on January 1, 2008. They were also a part of the 2013-14 AHL Outdoor Classic as the opponent of the Rochester Americans alumni team in December 2013.

One of the key initiatives of the Buffalo Sabres Alumni is to fund-raise and support their family of scholarships they award to high school seniors attending college.

Roster
 Rob Ray
 Grant Ledyard
 Craig Muni
 Ric Seiling
 Richie Dunn
 Darryl Shannon
 Morris Titanic
 Derek Smith
 Yuri Khmylev
 Richard Smehlik

Several other players have been known to play on the Sabres Alumni team, depending on the importance of the event. Such players, whose participation varies widely, include:
 The "French Connection" line of Rick Martin (prior to his death), Gilbert Perreault, and Rene Robert
 Larry Playfair
 Fred Stanfield
 Bill Hajt
 Lindy Ruff
 Danny Gare
 Tony McKegney
 Andrew Peters
 Mike Boland, a regular member until his death in 2017
 Daren Puppa, returned in 2019
Notable non-Sabres to have played for the team include:
 Mark Laforest, a Welland, Ontario native and journeyman NHL goalie
 Kevyn Adams, who played most of his NHL career with the Carolina Hurricanes. Adams  grew up in Clarence; he joined the team in 2009. Adams formerly served as an assistant coach with the Sabres. Adams now serves as the General Manager of the Sabres as of 2020.
 Seymour H. Knox IV, son of former Sabres owner Seymour H. Knox III and nephew of Northrup R. Knox, the only non-professional hockey player to have ever played for the team, playing goaltender on at least one occasion.
 Marcel Dionne, Hockey Hall of Fame centreman. Dionne resides in Buffalo but never played there in his career (he spent most of his career with the Los Angeles Kings). He has thus far played in two Sabres Alumni games—the first in 1997 (a fundraiser for Ted Darling as an opponent and again in 2007 (the Parete fundraiser) as a member of the team, thus making him the most prominent non-Sabre to play for the team.  Dionne at one time was affiliated with the Sabres' then-ECHL affiliate in Charleston, South Carolina.

References

External links
 Official Sabres Alumni Association Web site

Sports in Buffalo, New York
Buffalo Sabres
Ice hockey teams in New York (state)